is a Shinto shrine located in the Bunkyō ward of Tokyo, Japan.

Established in 458, it is now devoted to Tenjin, the kami of Learning. For this reason, it is also called Yushima Tenjin.

It is located very close to Ueno Park, and not far from the University of Tokyo. It is frequently sited by prospective students hoping to pass the entrance exams, particularly in April.  At this time, the temple receives many offerings of ema, votive tablets to petition the kami for success.

One of the most famous features of the shrine are the blossoms of his plum trees (ume) in the spring. In February and March, the annual festival Ume Matsuri is held, attracting many visitors.

History 

In February 1355 the shrine was expanded to enshrine the kami  as well. Tenjin is the deification of Sugawara no Michizane (845–903), a famous scholar, poet and politician from the Heian period. As a kami he is associated to scholarship and learning. Currently both kami are enshrined in Yushima Tenman-gū.

The shrine was later rebuilt in October 1455 at the behest of local warlord Ota Dokan (1432–1486), and enjoyed greater popularity during the Edo period when it was visited by such Confucian scholars as Hayashi Doshun (1583–1657) and Arai Hakuseki (1657–1725).

The current structures of Yushima Tenman-gū were rebuilt in 1995. They were made using only cypress, and following closely the tradition of Shinto architecture.

Gallery

Annual events 
The yearly events and festival at Yushima Tenman-gū are:

 Hatsumōde (New Year's visit) 1 – 7 January
 Ume Matsuri (Plum trees festival) 7 February – 7 March
 Tenjin-sai (The grand festival) 25 May
 Kiku Matsuri (The chrysanthemums flowers festival) 1 – 23 November

Access 
There is no admission fee for visitors to enter the shrine precincts. It is open from 6 am to 8 pm (the shop from 8:30 am to 7 pm).

The entrances is at a 2-minute walk from Exit 3 of Yushima Station on the Chiyoda Line.

Branch 

There is a branch of Yushima Tenmangū located in the Wakahowatauchi district of Nagano (city) next to the Kitano Museum of Art

References

External links 

Yushima Tenman-gū Official website

Shinto shrines in Tokyo
Buildings and structures in Bunkyō
Tenjin faith
Ueno, Tokyo
Sugawara no Michizane
Beppyo shrines